Rani Durgawati Museum is a museum in Jabalpur city in Madhya Pradesh state of India. It was established in 1976. It houses a fine collection of sculptures, inscriptions and prehistoric relics. The museum is dedicated to the memory of the Queen Durgavati.

References

Museums in Madhya Pradesh
Tourist attractions in Jabalpur
Buildings and structures in Jabalpur
1976 establishments in Madhya Pradesh
Museums established in 1976